Edixa is a brand of camera manufacturer Wirgin Kamerawerk which was based in Wiesbaden, West Germany. The product line included several 35mm cameras and 16mm Edixa 16 subminiature cameras designed by Heinz Waaske from the 1950s to the 1970s.

35mm cameras

Edixa Reflex, with Steinheil Quinon 1.9/55mm, Isco Travegar 2.8/50mm
Edixa-MAT REFLEX
Edixa REX TTL
Universal edixamat cd
Edixa Stereo
Edixa Electronica
Edixa motoric

16mm subminiature cameras

Edixa 16, with Isco Travegar 2.8/25mm lens
Edixa 16M, with Schneider-Kreuznach Xenar 2.8/25mm lens
Edixa 16MB, black model of Edixa 16M
Edixa 16U
Franka 16
alka 16

Body Alunimiu body with plastic trims。
Lenses: high-end Edixa 16MB/Edixa 16M uses Schneider-Kreuznach Xenar 25mm f/2.8 Tessar 4-element 3-group lens, mid-range Edixa 16 uses Travegar 25mm f/2.8 Tessar lens, the rest uses TRINAR Cooke triplet lens. *Focusing dial: unit lens movement focusing, 40mm to infinity.
Shutter: four leaves in front of the lens shutter, B, 1/30, 1/60, 1/150.

Film

Edixa 16mm uses Rollei 16 type RADA cartridge, loaded with unperforated 16mm film, film width 16mm， frame format 14x21mm, 20 exposures per cartridge.

Accessories
Chain
Genuine leather case
Lens hood
Color filter set
1m close up attachment lens
0.5m close up lens
0.25m close up lens
AG1 flash
Selenium exposure meter coupled to the shutter
Development tank
Slide projector

References
 Jörg Eikmann, Ulrich Vogt: Kameras für Millionen – Heinz Waaske, Konstrukteur. Wittig Fachbuch

External links 
Site with photos and  history section

German cameras
SLR cameras
Subminiature cameras
Wirgin cameras